Jean-Claude Brialy (30 March 1933 – 30 May 2007) was a French actor and film director.

Early life
Brialy was born in Aumale (now Sour El-Ghozlane), French Algeria, where his father was stationed with the French Army. Brialy moved to mainland France with his family in 1942. He was an alumnus of the Prytanée National Militaire. When he was 21 years old, he went to Paris to work as an actor.

Career
In 1956, Brialy acted in his first role in the short film Le coup du berger (Fool's Mate) by Jacques Rivette.

By the late 1950s, he'd become one of the most prolific actors in the French nouvelle vague and a star. He appeared in films of nouvelle vague directors such as Claude Chabrol (Le Beau Serge, 1958; Les Cousins, 1959), Louis Malle (Ascenseur pour l'échafaud, 1958; Les Amants, 1958), François Truffaut (Les 400 Coups, 1959), Jean-Luc Godard, (Une femme est une femme, 1961), Éric Rohmer (Claire's Knee, 1970), as well as in films of other filmmakers such as Jean Renoir (Elena et les hommes 1958), Roger Vadim (La ronde, 1964), Philippe de Broca (Le Roi de cœur, 1966), Luis Buñuel (Le Fantôme de la liberté, 1974), and Claude Lelouch (Robert et Robert, 1978).

In 2006, he appeared in his last role, as the eponymous character of the TV film Monsieur Max, directed by Gabriel Aghion. Godard described him as "the French Cary Grant," while Brialy's self-described "life models" had reportedly been actor Sacha Guitry and director Jean Cocteau.

Brialy directed a number of films, including Églantine in 1971, which was loosely inspired by his own memories of a happy childhood spent in Chambellay with his grandparents, and Les volets clos (Closed shutters) in 1972.

He  owned the restaurant L'Orangerie, on the Île Saint-Louis; he'd also worked as a TV presenter, a singer, and a radio host. During the presentation of one of his books, Brialy described himself this way: "I'm a boy who got lucky enough to do what I love in life".

Personal life and death
Brialy, in 1959, acquired a château in the commune of Monthyon, near Paris. There, he accommodated and entertained many friends from the cinema and the theatre, such as Jean Marais, Pierre Arditi, and Romy Schneider whom he'd met during the 1958 production of the film Christine. Schneider, after the 1981 fatal accident of her son David, found a "refuge from the paparazzi" in Brialy's home. French singer Barbara would often sing at the piano. Director Jean-Pierre Melville shot in the château the last scenes of his 1970 crime film Le Cercle Rouge, where Alain Delon and Yves Montand are killed by the police.

In his books, the autobiographical Le Ruisseau des singes (The river of monkeys) (2000) and the memoir J'ai oublié de vous dire (I Forgot to Tell You) (2004), Brialy revealed that he was bisexual.

Brialy died on 30 May 2007, in his Monthyon home, after a long time with cancer. He bequeathed his Monthyon estate to the commune of Meaux, near Monthyon, with the following codicil: that the Meaux authorities would finance the estate's maintenance as long as his partner, Bruno Finck, would reside there. In the summer of 2020, Finck left the estate and, for "health reasons," moved to the south of France, upon which time the commune of Meaux assumed full ownership of the estate. At the end of January 2021, the mayor invited the association of the Friends of Jean-Claude Brialy to "work in close collaboration [with Meaux]" in the context of "enhancing" the star's "heritage."

Honours
 : Commander of the Order of Cultural Merit (November 2002)

Filmography

As actor

As director
 Églantine (1971)
 Les volets clos (1973)
 L'oiseau rare (1973)
 Un amour de pluie (1974)

Notes

References

External links
 
 

1933 births
2007 deaths
People from Bouïra Province
French male film actors
French film directors
French male screenwriters
20th-century French screenwriters
French male stage actors
French theatre managers and producers
French LGBT actors
Bisexual male actors
LGBT film directors
French LGBT screenwriters
Commanders of the Order of Cultural Merit (Monaco)
Best Supporting Actor César Award winners
20th-century French male actors
21st-century French male actors
Deaths from cancer in France
Burials at Montmartre Cemetery
20th-century French male writers
20th-century French LGBT people